New Zealand studies is the academic field of area studies of New Zealand.

Subfields:
History of New Zealand
Literature of New Zealand
Politics of New Zealand
Economy of New Zealand
Culture of New Zealand

Institutions in New Zealand:
Victoria University of Wellington, Stout Research Centre for New Zealand Studies 

Institutions outside New Zealand:
Birkbeck, University of London Birkbeck Centre for New Zealand Studies  (opened 2008) 
Peking University in Beijing, opened c2005, see Barry Gustafson

Journals:
Journal of New Zealand Studies of the Stout Research Centre (annual) 

Māori studies is the academic field of cultural studies of the New Zealand Māori.

Subfields
Māori culture
Māori language
Māori politics
Māori religion

The main New Zealand universities all have a School of Māori Studies:
University of Auckland  
University of Waikato  
Massey University 
Victoria University of Wellington  
University of Canterbury  Māori web resources 
Lincoln University 
University of Otago

See also
Education in New Zealand
List of universities in New Zealand

External links
New Zealand Studies Association
New Zealand and Australian Studies in North America
New Zealand and Australian Studies, Georgetown University 
New Zealand and Australian Studies, University of Texas

Area studies
Oceania studies
Māori
Education in New Zealand